Miloš Stamatović (1914–1988) was a Yugoslav military officer who served as Military Governor of Zone B of the Free Territory of Trieste from 1951 to 1954, when the territory was finally split between Italy and Yugoslavia. During World War II, he served as political commissar of the South Herzegovina Partisan Detachment and engaged in prisoner exchange negotiations. In 1952, while military governor of Trieste, he tightened Yugoslav control over Zone B in response to decisions made in London which gave the Italians control over the civil administration of Zone A.

See also
List of governors of the Province of Trieste

References

1914 births
1988 deaths
Yugoslav Partisans members
Officers of the Yugoslav People's Army